Peter Keglevic (born 1950) is an Austrian film director and screenwriter. He has directed 30 films since 1976. His film Bella Donna was screened at the 1983 Cannes Film Festival.

Selected filmography

 Tatort: Beweisaufnahme (1981, TV series episode)
  (1981, TV film)
 Tatort: Sterben und sterben lassen (1982, TV series episode)
 Bella Donna (1983)
  (1985)
  (1987)
  (1988, TV film) — (based on a story by )
 The Play with Billions (1989, TV film)
 Kill Cruise (1990)
 The Police Murderer (1994) — (based on Cop Killer by Sjöwall and Wahlöö)
 Stockholm Marathon (1994) — (based on The Terrorists by Sjöwall and Wahlöö)
  (1994, TV film)
  (1996, TV film)
  (2000)
  (2001, TV film)
  (2006, TV miniseries)
 Die dunkle Seite (2008, TV film) — (based on a novel by Frank Schätzing)
  (2010, TV film) — (based on Whiteout by Ken Follett)
  (2011, TV film) — (based on The Man from Beijing by Henning Mankell)

References

External links

1950 births
Living people
Austrian film directors
Austrian television directors
Austrian screenwriters
Austrian male screenwriters
Film people from Salzburg